The Beachy Head Lady or Beachy Head Woman is an ancient skeleton discovered in Beachy Head, East Sussex, England. The Beachy Head Lady lived during the Roman period, around 125 to 245 AD. DNA analysis of the woman found that although she was born in the Eastbourne area of Britain, her ancestry was Southern European, most likely from Cyprus.

Remains and investigation 
As part of the Eastbourne Ancestors project, over 300 sets of human remains excavated from Anglo-Saxon cemeteries were re-examined. Heritage Officer Jo Seaman and his team found two boxes labelled "Beachy Head, something to do with 1956 or 1959". Inside they found a very well-preserved human skeleton. The Beachy Head Lady is the most complete skeleton in the collection.

Radiocarbon dating suggested a date range of 125 to 245 AD for the remains. Isotope analysis indicated that the Beachy Head Lady grew up in south-east England, and may have been born in the region. Initially, the skull shape led to an assessment that the woman had originated from Sub-Saharan Africa. This led some to claim erroneously that she had been the first known person of sub-Saharan origin in Britain. However, further DNA analysis established that the Beachy Head Lady was likely of Southern European origin from Cyprus.

Beachy Head Lady was aged around 22 to 25 when she died, and would have stood between 4 feet 9 inches and 5 feet 1 inch (1.45 m and 1.55 m) tall.

The Beachy Head Lady was exhibited to the public for the first time at the Eastbourne Redoubt. In 2021, the remains were moved to the newly refurbished "Beachy Head Story" visitor centre, closer to where they were found.

See also 

 Ivory Bangle Lady

References

External links
Beachy Head Story website

People from East Sussex
3rd-century women
Burials in East Sussex
Ancient Romans in Britain